Courtney Maum is an American author and book coach. She has written three novels: Costalegre (2019)  which was inspired by the life of Peggy Guggenheim's daughter Pegeen
, Touch (2017) a satirical novel about a trend forecaster, and her debut novel I'm Having so Much Fun Here Without You (2014).  Other notable works include her memoir The Year of the Horses (2022) and writer's guide BEFORE AND AFTER THE BOOK DEAL: A Writer’s Guide to Finishing, Publishing, Promoting and Surviving Your First Book Deal (edited by Julie Buntin) (2020).

References 

Brown University alumni
Living people
21st-century American women writers
Year of birth missing (living people)